Robert Chad McCracken  is a British former professional boxer who competed from 1991 to 2001, and has since worked as a boxing trainer. He once challenged for the WBC middleweight title in 2000. At regional level, he held the British super-welterweight title from 1994 to 1995; the Commonwealth middleweight title from 1995 to 1996; and once challenged for the vacant European middleweight title in 2001.

Boxing career

Amateur
McCracken worked as a wood machinist at Hoskins Cabinet Works, Bordesley, Birmingham before turning to boxing. He was affectionately known as "Boxing Bob". He represented England in the welterweight division, at the 1990 Commonwealth Games in Auckland, New Zealand, reaching the quarter finals.

Boxing for Birmingham City ABC, he was runner-up of the prestigious ABA light-welterweight championship in 1989.

Professional
McCracken turned pro in 1991 in the super-welterweight division. In February 1994 he won the British title by outpointing Andy Till, and defended it twice, outpointing Steve "The Viking" Foster and Paul Wesley.

In November 1995, he officially moved into the middleweight division, winning the vacant Commonwealth title by outpointing Canadian southpaw Fitzgerald Bruney. He would successfully retain the title twice by beating Paul Busby and Bruney again in a rematch, before relocating to the United States in 1997 and progressing up the world rankings.

In February 1998, he achieved a notable victory outpointing Lonnie Beasley, and over the course of four fights elevated himself to #1 contender status in the WBC rankings.

In April 2000 McCracken challenged American southpaw Keith Holmes for the WBC middleweight title. The fight was the main event of the UK show that preceded Lennox Lewis's high-profile fight with Michael Grant in New York the same night. To preserve his ranking McCracken had been inactive for a year and his ring rust showed, as he fell behind early and stayed there. The referee stopped the fight in the eleventh-round.

McCracken was inactive for another year while training other boxers, before returning in April 2001 to fight highly regarded Howard Eastman, who now held the British and Commonwealth titles and a 31–0 record. The vacant European title was also on the line, however McCracken's long layoffs once again hurt him, after a close, tough fight McCracken wilted in the tenth-round to Eastman's power punching.

Coaching
McCracken was the main and best head coach of the British boxing team at the 2012 Olympics.
McCracken has also trained retired super-middleweight champion Carl Froch. As of 2019, he is training Olympic gold medallist and former unified WBA (Super), IBF, WBO, and IBO heavyweight champion Anthony Joshua.

Honours
McCracken was appointed Member of the Order of the British Empire (MBE) in the 2013 New Year Honours for services to boxing and the London 2012 Olympic and Paralympic Games and Commander of the Order of the British Empire (CBE) in the 2022 New Year Honours for services to boxing.

References

Year of birth missing (living people)
Date of birth missing (living people)
Living people
Commanders of the Order of the British Empire
English male boxers
Boxers from Birmingham, West Midlands
British Boxing Board of Control champions
Commonwealth Boxing Council champions
Middleweight boxers
Boxers at the 1990 Commonwealth Games
Commonwealth Games competitors for England